Roger Mathew Grant is a music theorist specializing in the eighteenth century. He also works as a dramaturge, for example with Canadian filmmaker Bruce LaBruce on a film version of Arnold Schoenberg's "Pierrot Lunaire." Grant teaches at Wesleyan University.

Work 
According to a recent interview, Grant believes that "during the eighteenth century, debates within musical aesthetics re-scripted the role that performing musicians play in the creation and communication of affect."

Publications

Books 
Grant, Roger Mathew (2014). Beating Time and Measuring Music in the Early Modern Era New York: Oxford University Press. OCLC 1028553445.
Grant, Roger Mathew (2020). Peculiar Attunements: How Affect Theory Turned Musical. New York: Fordham University Press. OCLC 1144094031.

Articles 
 Grant, Roger Mathew (2008). “Hysteria at the Musical Surface." Music Theory Online 14 (1): n.p.
Grant, Roger Mathew (2013). “Ad infinitum: Numbers and Series in Early Modern Music Theory.” Music Theory Spectrum 35 (1): 62–76.
Grant, Roger Mathew (2017). “Peculiar Attunements: Comic Opera and Enlightenment Mimesis.” Critical Inquiry 43 (2): 550–569.

Awards 
 Emerging Scholar Award (Book), Society for Music Theory (2016), for Beating Time and Measuring Music in the Early Modern Era 
 Stanford Humanities Center, External Faculty Fellowship (2016–2017)

Projects 
In 2015 and 2016, Grant collaborated on a "radical reinterpretation" of Mozart's The Magic Flute in an installation at NYU's 80 Washington Square East Gallery with Jonathan Berger, Susanne Sachsse, Vaginal Davis, and Jamie Stewart.

Grant served as musical producer for Pierrot Lunaire (2014), a film by Bruce LaBruce and winner of the Teddy Jury Award, Berlinale International Film Festival.

References

Year of birth missing (living people)
Living people
Music theorists